The Sobolokh-Mayan (Soboloox Mayaan) is a river in Sakha Republic (Yakutia), Russia.

Lenok, taimen and whitefish are found in the waters of the Sobolokh-Mayan. There are no settlements by the river.

Course
The Sobolokh-Mayan is a right tributary of the Lena. In its first section the Sobolokh-Mayan flows across mountainous terrain. After leaving the mountains it flows into the Central Yakutian Lowland, forming meanders in the flat permafrost floodplain, until it joins the right bank of the Lena  from its mouth, near the mouth of the Khoruongka in the opposite bank.

See also
List of rivers of Russia

References

External links 
 Geography - Yakutia Organized

Rivers of the Sakha Republic
Verkhoyansk Range
Central Yakutian Lowland